José Alejandro Suárez Martín (born 6 March 1974), known as Alexis, is a Spanish retired footballer who played mainly as a central defender.

He amassed La Liga totals of 195 matches and seven goals over eight seasons, representing in the competition Tenerife, Levante and Valladolid.

Club career
Born in Las Palmas, Canary Islands, Alexis started playing professionally with hometown's UD Las Palmas, by then in Segunda División B. Subsequently, he joined neighbours CD Tenerife, making his La Liga debut in the 1995–96 season as they finished in fifth position.

After Tenerife's second top level relegation in four years, in 2002, Alexis played a further season with the club before signing for Levante UD, being instrumental in the Valencia side's 2004 promotion. Following another promotion and relegation with the latter he scored a rare goal in 2006–07, in a 1–0 away win against Recreativo de Huelva on 17 September 2006, being an undisputed first-choice throughout the top flight campaign (33 starts in 34 appearances, 2,979 minutes of action).

In the summer of 2007, Alexis moved to Real Valladolid, appearing sparingly throughout the season and being released in October of the following year despite still having a contract running, alongside teammate Cifu, in the same predicament.

References

External links

1974 births
Living people
Footballers from Las Palmas
Spanish footballers
Association football defenders
La Liga players
Segunda División players
Segunda División B players
UD Las Palmas players
CD Tenerife players
Levante UD footballers
Real Valladolid players